John Nicholas Ball (born 11 April 1946) is an English actor. He is best known for playing the title role in the television series Hazell.

He portrayed the vicious gang lord Terry Bates in EastEnders between 2007 and 2009. He played Garry Ryan in series five of Footballers' Wives and both series of its spin-off programme Footballers' Wives: Extra Time. The voice of Nicholas Ball can be heard as well on various audio books offered via the internet; he has narrated books from such authors as Christopher Hitchens and James Maybrick. He was, in 2019,  in an advert for Premier Inn, playing the part of Lenny Henry's manager.

Personal life
Ball was married to actress–comedian and psychologist, Pamela Stephenson from 1978 until her affair and eventual elopement, with Billy Connolly.

Selected TV and film roles
 Overlord (1975)
 The Crezz (1976)
 Rogue Male (1976)
 Who Is Killing the Great Chefs of Europe? (1978)
 Hazell (1978–79)
 The House that Bled to Death (1980) (TV) in the Hammer House of Horror series
 The Young Ones (TV series) Series 1; Episode: Interesting (1982)
 "Who Cares Wins - The Key To Success"  (Austin Rover staff training video) (1983)
 Bergerac (TV series) Two appearances: Series 2; Episode 7 (1983); Christmas Special (1988)
 Alas Smith and Jones, at least one appearance. Episode 1 (January 1984)
 Lifeforce (1985)
 Colin's Sandwich Series 2 (1989)
 Heartbeat (British TV series) Series 7; Episode 7 (1997) : as Charlie Fenton
 Red Dwarf Series 4, Justice (1991) : as the Simulant
 The Man Who Made Husbands Jealous (1997)
 Croupier (1998)
 Jonathan Creek Series 3; Episode 5 (1999) as Vince Rees
 Footballers' Wives: Extra Time  Series 1–2 (2005–2006)
 Footballers' Wives Series 5 (2006)
 Pie in the Sky  Series 3; Episode 4 (2006) : as DCI Doggett 
 Heartbeat Series 16; Episode 19 (2007) : as Gregory Flambard
 EastEnders (2007–2009, 2019)
 Sisterhood (2008)
 Hustle (TV series) (2009) : as Frank Rose
 Holby City (2015) : as Barry Copeland
 The Krays: Dead Man Walking (2018) : as Harry Webster
 Doctors (2020) : as Harold 'Aitch' Snetterton
 The Krays: New Blood (2021) : as Harry Webster

References

External links
 

1946 births
Living people
Male actors from Warwickshire
People from Leamington Spa
English male television actors
20th-century English male actors
21st-century English male actors